Achema-KKSC is women's volleyball club from Jonava, Lithuania.

Seasons
Results in the highest league of Lithuania:
 1998/1999 – 5th
 1999/2000 – 2nd
 2000/2001 – 3rd
 2001/2002 – 3rd
 2002/2003 – 3rd
 2003/2004 – 2nd
 2004/2005 – 5th
 2005/2006 – 2nd
 2006/2007 – 3rd
 2007/2008 – 1st
 2008/2009 – 1st
 2009/2010 – 1st
 2010/2011 – 3rd
 2011/2012 – 2nd
 2012/2013 - 1st
 2013/2014 - 1st

References

Lithuanian volleyball clubs
Sport in Jonava